Capron is a village in Boone County, Illinois, United States. It is part of the Rockford, Illinois Metropolitan Statistical Area. The population was 1395 at the 2020 census, up from 1,376 at the 2010 census.

History
Capron John was the founder.a post office has operated under the name Capron since 1861. Capron was named for John Capron, a pioneer settler.

Geography
Capron is located at  (42.397729, -88.739684).

Route 173 runs through the town.

Demographics

As of the 2020 census there were 1,395 people, 477 households, and 351 families residing in the village. The racial makeup of the village was 59.93% White, 1.15% African American, 0.79% Native American, 0.22% Asian, 0.00% Pacific Islander, 22.37% from other races, and 15.56% from two or more races. Hispanic or Latino of any race were 40.93% of the population.

There were 477 households, out of which 86.16% had children under the age of 18 living with them, 46.54% were married couples living together, 16.56% had a female householder with no husband present, and 26.42% were non-families. 17.61% of all households were made up of individuals, and 7.76% had someone living alone who was 65 years of age or older. The average household size was 3.93 and the average family size was 3.47.

The village's age distribution consisted of 29.1% under the age of 18, 10.7% from 18 to 24, 28.6% from 25 to 44, 24.1% from 45 to 64, and 7.5% who were 65 years of age or older. The median age was 30.9 years. For every 100 females, there were 113.7 males. For every 100 females age 18 and over, there were 99.3 males.

The median income for a household in the village was $67,316, and the median income for a family was $76,250. Males had a median income of $41,250 versus $23,568 for females. The per capita income for the village was $23,843. About 9.4% of families and 11.1% of the population were below the poverty line, including 14.0% of those under age 18 and 16.8% of those age 65 or over.

References

Villages in Boone County, Illinois
Villages in Illinois
Rockford metropolitan area, Illinois
1861 establishments in Illinois